Peter John Uglietto, (September 24, 1951) is an American prelate of the Roman Catholic Church, serving as an auxiliary bishop of the Archdiocese of Boston in Massachusetts and vicar general since 2010.

Biography

Early life 
Peter J. Uglietto was born in Cambridge, Massachusetts, on September 24, 1951.  He attended the Boston Archdiocesan Choir School in Cambridge and the Boston College High School in Boston before entering Boston College. After graduating with a Bachelor of Arts degree from Boston College in 1973, he entered Saint John's Seminary in Boston, receiving a Master of Divinity degree in 1977.

Priesthood 
Uglietto was ordained to the priesthood for the Archdiocese of Boston by Cardinal Humberto Medeiros on May 21, 1977, at the Cathedral of the Holy Cross in Boston.  After his ordination, Uglietto was assigned to several parishes in Eastern Massachusetts over the next 11 years: 

 St. Francis Xavier in Weymouth 
 St. Gregory in Dorchester
 St. Margaret of Scotland in Dorchester 

During this period, Uglietto also served as a retreat speaker for the Spiritual Development Office (1979 -1988) and adjunct spiritual director at St. John Seminary (1985-1988). For two years (1986-1988), he served as coordinator of spiritual directors and retreats with the diaconate program. In 1990, Uglietto began a three-year assignment as campus minister at Regis College in Weston, Massachusetts.

Uglietto earned a Licentiate in Sacred Theology from the Pontifical Lateran University at the Washington, D.C. campus of John Paul II Institute. Uglietto has also received a Master of Christian Spirituality degree from Creighton University in Omaha, Nebraska.In 2005, Uglietto began serving at Pope John XXIII National Seminary in Weston, first as a professor of moral theology, then as rector and finally as president.  He remained at the seminary until 2010.

Auxiliary Bishop of Boston
Uglietto was appointed as titular bishop of Thubursicum and auxiliary bishop of the Archdiocese of Boston on June 30, 2010, by Pope Benedict XVI. Uglietto was consecrated on September 14, 2010, by Cardinal Sean O’Malley.  As auxiliary bishop, Uglietto was assigned the north region of the archdiocese. He was appointed as vicar general and moderator of the curia for the archdiocese on February 3, 2014.

See also

 Catholic Church hierarchy
 Catholic Church in the United States
 Historical list of the Catholic bishops of the United States
 List of Catholic bishops of the United States
 Lists of patriarchs, archbishops, and bishops

References

External links
Meeting of International College in Medway, USA - Teams of Our Lady
Roman Catholic Archdiocese of Boston

Episcopal succession

 

21st-century American Roman Catholic titular bishops
1951 births
Living people
Pontifical Lateran University alumni
Roman Catholic Archdiocese of Boston
Religious leaders from Massachusetts
People from Cambridge, Massachusetts